Picture Brides is a 1933 American Pre-Code adventure film, directed by Phil Rosen. The film stars Dorothy Mackaill, Regis Toomey and Alan Hale.

Plot

Four mail order brides from New Orleans and a young girl conned into a non-existing job in Brazil find adventure, danger and romance in the jungle.

Cast
 Dorothy Mackaill as Mame Smith
 Regis Toomey as Dave Hart
 Alan Hale as Von Luden
 Harvey Clark as Doc Rogers
 Will Ahern as Brownie Brown
 Mary Kornman as Mataeo Rogers
 Esther Muir as Flo Lane
 Viva Tattersall as Lena - European Bride 
 Mae Busch as Gwen - British Bride

External links
 

Picture Brides available for free download at Internet Archive

References

Films directed by Phil Rosen
American black-and-white films
Films set in Brazil
American adventure films
1933 adventure films
1933 films
1930s American films
1930s English-language films
English-language adventure films